Stephanie Young-Brehm  is an American voice actress and singer primarily known for her voice-over work in English-language dubs for Japanese anime.  Her best-known roles include Nico Robin in the Funimation dub of One Piece, Arachne in Soul Eater, Towa in Dragon Ball Xenoverse 2, Clare in Claymore and Olivier Armstrong in Fullmetal Alchemist: Brotherhood. Young graduated from Baylor University with a degree in theatre performance and was nominated twice for the Dallas Theatre League's Leon Rabin Award.
She has also appeared in various TV and film projects, including the Lifetime film and web series Inspector Mom.

Personal life
Young is a singer/songwriter for the Dallas-based jazz band, The Brehms, along with her husband, David Lee Brehm, who is also a songwriter and guitarist.

Filmography

Anime series

Film

Television films, specials and direct-to-video

Video games

References

External links
 
 
 
 

Living people
Actresses from Dallas
American video game actresses
American voice actresses
Baylor University alumni
Place of birth missing (living people)
Singers from Texas
Year of birth missing (living people)
21st-century American actresses
21st-century American singers
21st-century American women singers